Generalleutnant Werner Panitzki (27 May 1911, in Kiel –  2 June 2000) was a German Air Force general. He was Inspector of the Air Force, the senior air force appointment, from 1962 to 1966.

On 25 August 1966, the Federal Minister of Defence, Kai-Uwe von Hassel, dismissed Panitzki, at his own request, because Panitzki in an interview had characterized the procurement of the Lockheed F-104 Starfighter fighter aircraft as a "purely political decision".

References
German Air Force - Werner Panitzki (German)

1911 births
2000 deaths
Bundeswehr generals
Military personnel from Kiel
Lieutenant generals of the German Air Force
Knights Commander of the Order of Merit of the Federal Republic of Germany
German World War II pilots